Saxby is an English surname. Notable people with the surname include:

Alf Saxby (1897–1966), English footballer
Edward Saxby (1616–1658), English Puritan soldier
Henry Saxby (1836–1873), English ornithologist
John Saxby (1821–1913), British engineer and railway pioneer
Kerry Saxby (born 1961), Australian race walker 
Robin Saxby (born 1947), British businessman
Selaine Saxby (born 1970), British politician
Stephen Martin Saxby (1804–1883), English meteorologist and naval officer 
George Saxby Penfold (1769–1846), a Church of England clergyman
Fictional characters:
Bert Saxby, from James Bond

Surnames
Surnames of English origin
Surnames of British Isles origin
English-language surnames